, or in its full name  is a small temple located in Higashiyama, Kyoto, Japan. The temple can be found in the vicinity of Kiyomizu-dera.

The temple is dedicated to  a nickname of its main worship object , a blue, guardian warrior and to the "three wise monkeys". They represent the Kōshin faith. 

In Kōshin belief, Kōshin-san is thought to help all those who strive in their livings, with all their efforts to be good persons. He is also thought to punish the bad.

Kukurizaru is the round, ball shaped talisman made of cloth, representing the good faith monkeys.

Kukurizaru
In many places at the temple hang color balls representing Kukurizaru, a monkey with bound feet and hands. In Kōshin belief, it represents the control of the playful and desire-driven creature everyone has inside his body.

The folk faith says that to have a wish granted, you must sacrifice one desire. If you put your desire inside one of the color balls that represent the monkey Kukurizaru, Kōshin will help you to make that desire vanish and because desires are what keep wishes from coming true, your wish will be granted and you will also become a better person.

It is also said that when you feel a desire coming you must put your hands together and recite the Buddhist sutra: On deiba yakisya banta banta kakakaka sowaka. Kukurizaru and Kōshin-san will hear and will come to help you.

There are old traditions and beliefs regarding monkeys in Japan. Monkeys are considered kind spirits protecting us and our homes from evil spirits and  harmful intentions. The three monkeys in the attitude of "not hearing, not seeing, not talking" are a part of the Kōshin faith.

References
 E. OhnukiTierney, Monkey as Mirror Symbolic Transformations in Japanese History & Ritual, Princeton University Press, 1992, 
 Emi Kitagawa, Information Leaflet for Yasaka Koshindo temple, Kyoto Saga University of Arts, Department of Tourism Design
 Kyoto Prefectural Government Tourism and Convention Office, Three Monkeys Shrine (Yasaka Koshindo Shrine), Kyoto

External links
 Official site
 Visiting the Koshindo Temple - Uniyatra

Buddhist temples in Kyoto
Tendai temples
Shinto in Kyoto